Kanakpur Union is a Union Parishad under Moulvibazar Sadar Upazila of Moulvibazar District in the division of Sylhet, Bangladesh. It has an area of 23.5 square kilometres and a population of 18,458.

History 
The etymology of the union is of two words; "Kanak" and "Pur". The word Kanak comes from Sanskrit and means gold or possibly imitative of clanking metal. The word Pur is also from Sanskrit and means city. Therefore, the literal translation would be the city of gold.

Geography 
Kanakpur Union is located in the part of Moulvibazar Sadar Upazila and shares borders with the Mostafapur Union in the east. It has an area of 23.5 square kilometres.

Demography 
Kanakpur has a population of 18,458.

Administration 
Kanakpur constitutes the no. 8 union council of Moulvibazar Sadar Upazila. It contains 49 villages and 14 mouzas.

Villages 
 Haridatta, Shaoniya, Abda, Bachandar, Satyapur, Barhal, Halgar
 Rakha, Nagra, Audatta, Ballabhdatta, Bhadgaon, Binshona, Rangdas
 Kobiraji, Dojbali, Poilpara, Chondibhandar, Buddhimontopur, Khagrakandi, Bagmara
 Maijpara, Kandipara, Bidya'r Mahal, Islampur, Damiya, Fatehpur, Durlabhpur
 Dattabinshona, Banidhupi, Dvipiya, Thekshaliya, Harmahal, Dhoupasha, Khasharikona
 Doliya, Srirampur, Srirainagar, Poton, Bajekrati, Kanakpur
 Shariya, Goyghor, Noldariya, Rajapur, Borkapon, Raypur, Mamrokpur, Nandiura

Economy and tourism 
Kanakpur has a significant number of British and American immigrants contributing to its economy. It has two bazaars.

Education 
The Union has a literacy rate of 56.61%.

Primary 
It has 14 state primary schools and 1 private primary school. They are as follows:
 Bhadgaon Government Primary School
 Buddhimontopur Government Primary School
 Damiya Abda Government Primary School
 Raypur Mamrokpur Government Primary School
 Naldariya Government Primary School
 Kanakpur Government Primary School
 Durlavpur Government Primary School
 Haridatta Government Primary School
 Binshona Government Primary School
 Dipiya Government Primary School
 Baro Haal Government Primary School
 Fatehpur Government Primary School
 Shah Bondor Government Primary School
 Sardar Bari Reg. Primary School

It also has 3 kindergartens: Sunrise KG School, Shah Jalal KG School and Srirainagar KG School

Secondary 
It has one high school called Bhadgaon Taher un-Nessa High School.

Religious 
There are six madrasas and they are as follows:
 Bhadgaon Imdad ul-Uloom Madrasa
 Buddhimontopur Muhyi us-Sunnah Dakhil Madrasa
 Buddhimontopur Hafizia Madrasa
 Damiya Hafizia Madrasa
 Raypur Mamrokpur Title Madrasa
 Shah Bondor Madrasa

Language and culture 
The native population converse in their native Sylheti dialect but can also converse in Standard Bengali. Languages such as Arabic and English are also taught in schools. The Union has 47 mosques:
 Borkapon Jame Masjid and Rajapur Satyapur Borkapon Jame Masjid
 North Bhadgaon Jame Masjid, West Bhadgaon Jame Masjid, South Bhadgaon Jame Masjid, Bhadgaon Bakhsh Bari Jame Masjid and Bhadgaon Sardar Bari Jame Masjid
 Chok Rajpur Jame Masjid
 Islampur Jame Masjid
 Bagmara Jame Masjid
 Khagrakandi Jame Masjid
 Buddhimontopur Jame Masjid and West Buddhimontopur Jame Masjid
 Abda Bazar Jame Masjid, North Abda Jame Masjid and Rajapur Abda Jame Masjid
 Damiya Jame Masjid and Damiya Shah Murad Jame Masjid
 Bochondhor Jame Masjid
 Raypur Jame Masjid
 Mamrokpur Jame Masjid
 Noldariya Jame Masjid
 North Kanakpur Jame Masjid and Kanakpur Bus Stand Jame Masjid
 Durlavpur Jame Masjid
 Shah Bandar Jame Masjid
 Srirampur Jame Masjid and Srirampur Panjegana Masjid
 Rakha Jame Masjid, Rakha Peer Bari Jame Masjid and Rakha Master Motin Bari Panjegana Masjid
 Nagra Jame Masjid
 Rangdas Jame Masjid
 Kabiraji Jame Masjid
 Binshona Jame Masjid, Binshona Master Yusuf Bari Panjegana Masjid, Dattabinshona Panjegana Masjid and Binshona Rezaq Ullah Bari Panjegana Masjid
 Syed Abdul Hamid Waqf Estate and Panjegana Masjid
 Poton Panjegana Masjid
 Halgor Panjegana Masjid
 Srirainagar Panjegana Masjid
 Poilpara Al-Khair Panjegana Masjid
 Audatta Panjegana Masjid
 Dhoupasha Panjegana Masjid
 Dipiya Panjegana Masjid
 Maijpara Ashroyon Prokolpo Panjegana Masjid

It also has 9 eidgahs:
 Bhadgaon Eidgah
 Bochbondor Eidgah
 Buddhimontopur Eidgah
 Naldariya Eidgah
 Kanakpur Eidgah
 Durlavpur Eidgah
 Rakha Eidgah
 Dipiya Eidgah
 Shahbondor Eidgah

List of chairmen

References

Unions of Moulvibazar Sadar Upazila